The Maralinga Tjarutja, or Maralinga Tjarutja Council, is the corporation representing the traditional Anangu owners of the remote western areas of South Australia known as the Maralinga Tjarutja lands. The council was established by the Maralinga Tjarutja Land Rights Act 1984. The area is one of the four regions of South Australia classified as an Aboriginal Council (AC) and not incorporated within a local government area.

The Aboriginal Australian people whose historic rights over the area have been officially recognised belong to the southern branch of the Pitjantjatjara people. The land includes a large area of land contaminated by British nuclear testing in the 1950s, for which the inhabitants were eventually compensated in 1991.

Languages and peoples
The Maralinga Tjarutja people belong to a general Western Desert ecological zone sharing cultural affinities with the Pitjantjatjara, Yankunytjatjara and Ngaanyatjarra to their north and the Pila Nguru of the spinifex plains to their west, They speak dialects of Pitjantjatjara and Yankunytjatjara.

Ecology and cultural beliefs
The term maralinga is not of local origin. It is a term chosen from the Garig or Garik dialect of the now-extinct Northern Territory Ilgar language, signifying "field of thunder/thunder", and was selected to designate the area where atomic bomb testing was to be undertaken by the then Chief Scientist of the Department of Supply, W. A. S. Butement. The land was covered in spinifex grasses and good red soil (parna wiru) furnishing fine camping.

Waterholes (kapi) have a prominent function in their mythology: they are inhabited by spirit children and thought of as birth places, and control of them demarcate the various tribal groups. According to Ronald Berndt, one particular water snake, Wanampi, tutelage spirit over native doctors, whose fertility function appears to parallel in some respects that of the Rainbow serpent of Arnhem Land myth, was regarded as the creator of these kapi, and figured prominently in male initiation ceremonies.

Contact
Ooldea or Yuldi/Yutulynga/Yooldool (the place of abundant water) sits on a permanent underground aquifer . The area is thought to have been originally part of Wirangu land, lying on its northern border, though it fell within the boundaries of a Kokatha emu totem group. It served several Aboriginal peoples, furnishing them with a ceremonial site, trade node and meeting place for other groups, from the northeast who would travel several hundred miles to visit kin. Among the peoples who congregated there were tribes from the Kokatha and Ngalea northern groups and Wirangu of south-east and Mirning south-west. By the time Daisy Bates (1919–1935) took up residence there it was thought that earlier groups had disappeared, replaced by an influx of spinifex people from the north. By her time, the Trans-Australian Railway route had just been completed, coinciding with a drought that drew the Western desert peoples to the depot at Ooldea.

Beginning in the 1890s, there was a gradual encroachment by pastoralists up to the southern periphery of the Nullarbor Plain, but the lack of adequate water to sustain stock maintained the region relatively intact from intense exploitation. In 1933 the United Aborigines Missions established itself there, drawing substantial numbers of desert folk to the site for food and clothing, and four years later, the government established a  reserve. In 1941, the anthropologists Ronald and Catherine Berndt spent several months in the Aboriginal camp at the water soak and mission, and in the following three-year period (1942–1945) wrote one of the first scientific ethnographies of an Australian tribal group, based on his interviews in a community of some 700 desert people. Traditional life still continued since Ooldea lay on the fringe of the desert, and incoming Aboriginal people could return to their old hunting style.

Nuclear testing, dispossession and return

When the Australian Government decided in the early 1950s to set aside the Emu Field and Maralinga in the area for British nuclear testing, the community at Ooldea was forcibly removed from the land and resettled further south at Yalata, in 1952. Road blocks and soldiers barred any return.

Yalata, bordering on the Nullarbor Plain offered a totally different ecological environment; in place of the spinifex plains to the north, the Maralinga Tjaruta people found an arid stone plain, with poor thin soil and a powdery limestone that kicked up a grey dust when disturbed. Their word for "grey", namely tjilpi also signified the greying elders of a tribe, and the Aboriginal residents of Yalata called the new area parna tjilpi, the "grey earth/ground", suggesting that their forced relocation to Yalata went concomitantly with ageing towards death.

Between 1956 and 1957, seven atomic bombs were exploded on Maralinga land. In further minor trials from 1957 to 1962, plutonium was dispersed widely over much of the area.

In 1962, the long-serving Premier of South Australia, Sir Thomas Playford, made a promise that their traditional lands would be restored to the people displaced at Yalata sometime in the future. Under the administration of his successor Frank Walsh, short two-week long bush trips were permitted, enabling them to re-connect with their traditional lifestyles. As negotiations got underway in the 1980s, the Indigenous peoples started setting up outstations near their original lands. With the passage of the Maralinga Tjarutja Land Rights Act 1984 under Premier John Bannon's government, the Maralinga Tjarutja secured freehold title in 1984, and the right to developmental funds from the State and Federal governments. They completed a move back into the area, to a new community called Oak Valley in March 1985.

Under an agreement between the governments of the United Kingdom and Australia in 1995, efforts were made to clean up the Maralinga site, being completed in 1995. The effectiveness of the cleanup has been disputed on a number of occasions.

In 2003 South Australian Premier Mike Rann opened a new school costing  at Oak Valley. The new school replaced two caravans with no running water or air-conditioning, a facility that had been described as the "worst school in Australia".

It includes the Serpentine Lakes and was the largest land return since Premier John Bannon's hand over of Maralinga lands in 1984. The returned lands included the sacred Ooldea area, which also included the site of Daisy Bates' mission camp.

In 2014, the last part of the land remaining in the Woomera Prohibited Area, known as "Section 400", was excised and returned to free access.

Maralinga Tjarutja Council
The Maralinga Tjarutja Council is an incorporated body constituted by the traditional Yalata and Maralinga owners to administer the lands granted to them under the Maralinga Tjarutja Land Rights Act 1984 (SA). The head office is in Ceduna.

The Maralinga Tjarutja and the Pila Nguru (or Spinifex people) also jointly own and administer the  Mamungari Conservation Park, which area is contained in the area total for the council area. Emu Field is now part of the council area, too, while the  Maralinga area is still a roughly square-shaped enclave within the council area.

The land surveyed and known as Section 400,  within the Taranaki Plumes, was returned to Traditional Ownership in 2007. This land includes the area of land occupied by the Maralinga Township and the areas in which atomic tests were carried out by the British and Australian governments.

The final part of the  former nuclear test site was returned in 2014.

Documentary film
Maralinga Tjarutja, a May 2020 television documentary film directed by Larissa Behrendt and made by Blackfella Films for ABC Television, tells the story of the people of Maralinga. It was deliberately broadcast around the same time that the drama series Operation Buffalo was on, to give voice to the Indigenous people of the area and show how it disrupted their lives. Screenhub gave it 4.5 stars, calling it an "excellent documentary". The film shows the resilience of the Maralinga Tjarutja people, in which the elders "reveal a perspective of deep time and an understanding of place that generates respect for the sacredness of both", their ancestors having lived in the area for millennia. Despite the callous disregard for their occupation of the land shown by the British and Australians involved in the testing, the people have continued to fight for their rights to look after the contaminated land.

The film, which was produced by Darren Dale, won the 2020 AACTA Award for Best Direction in Nonfiction Television and the Silver Award for Documentary (Human Rights) at the 2021 New York Festivals TV & Film Awards.

See also
 Maralinga, South Australia
 British nuclear tests at Maralinga
 Woomera Prohibited Area
 Downwinders

Notes

Citations

Sources

Further reading

External links
 
 Agreements, Treaties and Negotiated Settlements (ATNS) project:
 Maralinga Tjarutja Council
 Southern Pitjantjatjara People
 Aboriginal Legal Rights Movement Inc
 Pitjantjatjara people (Anangu Pitjantjatjara)
 Oak Valley (Maralinga) Inc.
 Maralinga Piling Trust (1994 - )
 Strategy for Aboriginal Managed Lands in South Australia (2000 - ) (SAMLISA)
 SAMLISA Steering Committee
 Hansard extract from South Australian House of Assembly, 15 October 2003, of Second Reading Speech on co-management of the unnamed conservation park

Aboriginal land rights in Australia
Local government areas of South Australia
Nullarbor Plain
Pitjantjatjara